Elmore State Park is a state park located in Elmore, Vermont, United States.  It includes Lake Elmore and Elmore Mountain, and has day-use facilities for picnicking, hiking, and water-based activities, and a 59-site campground.  Some of its facilities were developed in the 1930s by the Civilian Conservation Corps; for these, it was listed on the National Register of Historic Places in 2002.  The park is open seasonally between Memorial Day and Columbus Day; fees are charged for day use and camping.

Features
Elmore State Park is located in northern Elmore, a rural community in southern Lamoille County, Vermont. Its developed area is located at the northern end of the lake, where Beach Road runs west from Vermont Route 12. The campground facilities, located north of the beach include 44 tent/RV sites and 15 lean-tos, two restrooms with hot showers, and a sanitary dump station. The day-use area features a sandy beach, with a CCC-built beach house which includes a community room, a concession stand and cafe, restrooms and boat rentals. The park has easy access to hiking trails on Elmore Mountain, which lead to the observation tower at its summit.

History
This occurred during the Great Depression, and the state set the Civilian Conservation Corps to work transforming the gift of land, along with adjacent federal lands, into a park. CCC crews, whose encampment remains are also found in the area, built the main access road, the beach house and the beach between 1934 and 1936. The federal portion of the park was turned over to the state in 1938, which built the observation tower atop Elmore Mountain the following year. The campground was added in 1963.

See also
National Register of Historic Places listings in Lamoille County, Vermont

References 

ePodunk

External links

Elmore State Park - Vermont State Parks
Camp Vermont

State parks of Vermont
Protected areas of Lamoille County, Vermont
Elmore, Vermont
State parks of the Appalachians
Civilian Conservation Corps in Vermont
Historic districts on the National Register of Historic Places in Vermont
National Register of Historic Places in Lamoille County, Vermont
1934 establishments in Vermont